Swiss recording artist Stefanie Heinzmann has released six studio albums and 18 singles as a lead artist. In 2008, Heinzmann won SSDSDSSWEMUGABRTLAD, a talent contest hosted in TV total on the German ProSieben network, and was subsequently offered a recording contract with Universal Music Domestic. Her coronation song "My Man Is a Mean Man" debuted straight on top of the Swiss Singles Chart and reached the top ten in Austria and Germany. Heinzmann's debut album Masterplan was released in March 2008. It made it to the top ten in Austria and Germany and also debuted atop the album charts in Switzerland, where it was certified platinum by the IFPI for sales in excess of 30,000 copies. The album was reissued the same year and followed by her second album Roots to Grow in September 2009. Albeit less successful commercially, it peaked at number four on the Swiss Albums Chart and made it to the top twenty in Germany. Leading single "No One (Can Ever Change My Mind)" reached the top thirty of the Swiss Singles Chart. 

Following a longer hiatus, Heinzmann released her self-titled third album in 2012. The album's first offering, "Diggin' in the Dirt" reached number six in Switzerland as well as the top twenty and top thirty in Germany and Switzerland respectively, marking her highest-charting single since "My Man Is a Mean Man". Equally successful, Stefanie Heinzmann became a top ten success in both Switzerland and Germany. Heinzmann's fourth album Chance of Rain was released in March 2015 and became her fourth consecutive album to reach the top five in Switzerland. It produced the top ten hit "In the End". In September 2018, Heinzmann released the single "Build a House", a collaboration with German DJ and producer Alle Farben. It reached the top forty of the Swiss Singles Chart and preceded her fifth studio album All We Need Is Love, released in March 2019, which became her first album to top the Swiss Albums Chart since her 2008 debut album Masterplan. The album produced three singles, including lead single "Mother's Heart" and  follow-up "Shadows," all of which failed to chart but received radio airplay.

Albums

Singles

Other charted songs

Appearances

Music videos

References

External links
 Official Website (German)

Heinzmann, Stefanie